Mohammad or Muhammad Asif may also refer to:

 Mohammad Asif (cricketer) (born 1982), Pakistani cricketer
 Mohammad Asif (politician), Tamil Nadu politician and minister
 Mohammad Asif (Omani cricketer) (born 1970), Pakistan-born Omani cricketer
 Mohammad Asif Nang (born 1972), Afghan governor of Farah Province
 Mohammad Asif Rahimi (born 1959), Afghan politician
 Mohammad Asif Khokan (born 1936), former Afghan wrestler
 Mohammad Asif Shazada (1919–1998), former Afghan field hockey player
 Mohammad Asif (snooker player), Pakistani snooker player
 Muhammad Asif (baseball) (born 1986), Pakistani baseball player
 Mohammad Asif (umpire) (born 1973), Pakistani cricket umpire
 Khawaja Muhammad Asif (born 1949), Pakistani minister and politician
 Sardar Muhammad Asif Nakai (born 1960), Pakistani politician
 Muhammad Asif Sandila (born 1954), former Pakistani Chief of Naval Staff
 Muhammad Rizwan Asif (born 1990), Pakistani footballer
 Muhammad Asif Mohseni (born 1935), Shia Twelver clergy